Sino-Soviet relations (sovetsko-kitayskiye otnosheniya), or China–Soviet Union relations, refers to the diplomatic relationship between China (both the Chinese Republic of 1912–1949 and its successor, the People's Republic of China) and the various forms of Soviet Power which emerged from the Russian Revolution of 1917 to 1991, when the Soviet Union ceased to exist.

Country comparison

Russian Civil War and Mongolia
The Beiyang government in North China joined the Allied intervention in the Russian Civil War, sending forces to Siberia and North Russia beginning in 1918.

Mongolia and Tuva became contested territories. After being occupied by the Chinese General Xu Shuzheng in 1919, they came under the sway of the Russian White Guard General turned independent warlord, Roman von Ungern-Sternberg in 1920. Soviet troops, with support from Mongolian guerrillas led by Damdin Sükhbaatar, defeated the White warlord and established a new pro-Soviet Mongolian client state, which by 1924 became the Mongolian People's Republic.

KMT–CCP, the Chinese Civil War and the establishment of diplomatic relations
In 1921, Soviet Russia began supporting the Kuomintang (KMT), and in 1923 the Comintern instructed the Communist Party of China (commonly abbreviated as CCP) to sign a military treaty with the KMT. On 31 May 1924, the two governments signed an agreement to establish diplomatic relations. But in 1926 KMT leader Chiang Kai-shek abruptly dismissed his Soviet advisers and imposed restrictions on CCP participation in the government. By 1927, after the conclusion of the Northern Expedition, Chiang purged the CCP from the KMT–CCP Alliance, resulting in the Chinese Civil War which would last until 1949, a few months after the proclamation of the People's Republic of China, led by Mao Zedong. During the war the Soviets gave some support to the CCP, which in 1934 suffered a crushing blow when the KMT brought an end to the Chinese Soviet Republic, thus causing the CCP's Long March from Shaanxi. The Soviet Union tried and failed in an attempt to make the Hui hostile to China.

Sino-Soviet conflict, 1929

The Sino-Soviet conflict of 1929 was a minor armed conflict between the Soviet Union and China over the Manchurian Chinese Eastern Railway. The Chinese seized the Manchurian Chinese Eastern Railway in 1929, swift Soviet military intervention quickly put an end to the crisis and forced the Chinese to accept restoration of joint Soviet–Chinese administration of the railway.

Soviet invasion of Xinjiang

In 1934, the Republic of China's 36th Division (National Revolutionary Army), which was composed of Muslims, severely mauled the Soviet Union's Red Army and their White movement allies when the Soviets attempted to seize Xinjiang.

Islamic rebellion in Xinjiang, 1937

The Soviet Union intervened again in Xinjiang in 1937.

Second Sino-Japanese War and World War II

In 1931, Japan invaded Manchuria and created the puppet state of Manchukuo (1932), which signaled the beginning of the Second Sino-Japanese War. In August 1937, a month after the Marco Polo Bridge Incident, the Soviet Union established a non-aggression pact with China. The Republic of China received credits for $250 million for the purchase of Soviet weapons. There followed big arms deliveries, including guns, artillery pieces, more than 900 aircraft and 82 tanks. More than 1,500 Soviet military advisers and about 2,000 members of the air force were sent to China. The deliveries halted in August 1941 due to the German invasion of the Soviet Union. Joseph Stalin viewed Japan as a potential enemy, and as a result offered no help to Chinese communists between 1937 and 1941, in order not to weaken efforts of the Nationalist government. During the World War II period, the two countries suffered more losses than any other country, with China (in the Second Sino-Japanese War) losing about 30 million people and the Soviet Union 26 million.

Joint victory over Imperial Japan
On 8 August 1945, three months after Nazi Germany surrendered, and on the week of the atomic bombings of Hiroshima and Nagasaki by the United States, the Soviet Union launched the invasion of Manchuria, a massive military operation mobilizing 1.5 million soldiers against one million Kwantung Army troops, the last remaining Japanese military presence. Soviet forces won a decisive victory while the Kwantung suffered massive casualties, with 700,000 having surrendered. The Soviet Union distributed some of the weapons of the captured Kwantung Army to the CCP, who were still battling the KMT in the Chinese Civil War.

In late August 1945, Stalin proposed to Mao that the region north of the Yangtze river be ruled by the CCP and that the region south by ruled by the KMT. According to Wang Jiaxiang, China's first ambassador to the Soviet Union, Stalin was concerned by the independent streak of communist China and was concerned about the prospect of future competition with the Soviet Union.

Ili Rebellion

While the Republic of China was concentrating on the Second Sino-Japanese War, the Soviet Union supported Uyghur nationalists in their uprise in Xinjiang and set up Second East Turkestan Republic against the Kuomintang. After the Communist Party of China defeated the Kuomintang in 1949, the Soviet Union terminated support for the Second East Turkestan Republic.

The Soviets tried to spread anti-Chinese propaganda among minorities in Xinjiang, but this backfired when Uyghur mobs attacked White Russians and called for them to be expelled from Xinjiang.

Pei-ta-shan Incident

Chinese Muslim forces fought against Soviet and Mongol troops in this incident.

Chinese Civil War and the People's Republic of China
After 1946, the CCP was increasingly successful in the Civil War. In May 1948, the Soviet Union advised the CCP not to cross the Yangtze river with its army. The CCP ignored this advice, and the People's Liberation Army launched a crossing of the Yangtze river and captured the KMT's capital city, Nanjing, in only a matter of days.

On 30 June 1949, Mao stated that China would "lean to one side" in the Cold War era and favor the socialist camp over the capitalist camp. Mao announced that China must ally "with the Soviet Union, with every New Democratic Country, and with the proletariat and broad masses in all other countries".

On 1 October 1949, the People's Republic of China was proclaimed by Mao Zedong, and by May 1950 the KMT had been expelled from Mainland China, remaining in control of Taiwan. With the creation of the People's Republic of China, the supreme political authority in the two countries became centred in two communist parties, both espousing revolutionary, Marxist–Leninist ideology: the CCP and the Communist Party of the Soviet Union. The day after the PRC's founding, the Soviet Union terminated its diplomatic relations with the KMT and recognized the PRC.

In late 1949, Mao went to Moscow to seek economic help. Stalin kept him waiting for weeks, humiliating Mao in treatment worthy of a minor vassal. After the establishment of the People's Republic of China, a sensitive issue emerged. As a condition of fighting the Kwantung Army at the end of World War II, the Soviet Union received usage rights of the Chinese Eastern Railway, the South Manchuria Railway, Lüshun (also known as Port Arthur) and Dalian. These privileges were significant in the Asian strategies of the Soviet Union because Port Arthur and Dalian were ice-free ports for the Soviet Navy, and the Chinese Eastern Railway and the South Manchuria Railway were the essential arterial communications which connected Siberia to Port Arthur and Dalian. As Mao Zedong thought that the usage rights of the Chinese Eastern Railway, the South Manchuria Railway, the Port Arthur and Dalian were part of Chinese state sovereignty, he required the Soviet Union to return these interests to China, and this was a crucial part of the Sino-Soviet Treaty of Friendship. Joseph Stalin initially refused this treaty, but finally agreed with this treaty. However, the ports were not returned until after Stalin died.

Stalin allowed Kim Il-sung to launch the Korean War. However, both Kim Il-sung and Stalin did not consider that the United States would intervene into that war immediately, if at all. Kim Il-sung could not sustain the attack against the United States Army. When Kim Il-sung required military assistance from the Soviet Union and China, Mao agreed to send Chinese troops, but asked the Soviet Air Forces to provide air cover. As the two leaders distrusted each other, Stalin agreed with sending Chinese troops to Korea, but refused to provide air cover. Since without the air cover from the Soviet Union, Mao once considered that China did not send troops into Korea, and Stalin at one time decided to give up the Korea Peninsula. After much cogitation, Mao solely sent Chinese troops into Korea on 19 October 1950 under an extremely hard Chinese economic and military situation. This activity ultimately changed the Sino-Soviet relationship. After 12 days of Chinese troops entering the war, Stalin allowed the Soviet Air Forces to provide air cover, and supported more aid to China. Mao sending Chinese troops to take part in the Korean War was followed by large-scale economic and military cooperation between China and the Soviet Union, and the friendly relationship of the two countries changed from titular to virtual. In one less known example of the Sino-Soviet military cooperation, in April–June 1952 a group of Soviet Tupolev Tu-4 aircraft were based in Beijing to perform reconnaissance missions on United States fusion bomb tests in the Pacific.

Sino-Soviet split

Thus, in the immediate years after the PRC was proclaimed, the Soviet Union became its closest ally. Moscow sent thousands of Soviet engineers and workers, and trainloads of machinery and tools. By the late 1950s, the Soviets had erected a network of modern industrial plants across China, capable of producing warplanes, tanks and warships. Moscow even provided some nuclear technology. Mao, however, was deeply distrusted by Nikita Khrushchev for abandoning the strict traditions of Lenin and Stalin. In the late 1950s – early 1960s, relations became deeply strained. By attacking Soviet revisionism, Mao consolidated his political struggle in Beijing and won over his opponents. Khrushchev ridiculed the failures of the Great Leap Forward and the people's commune movement. The Sino-Soviet split was marked by small scale fighting in the Sino-Soviet border conflict in 1969. Moscow considered a preemptive nuclear strike. That never happened, but the Soviets did encourage Uyghurs to rebel against China. More important, China launched its own bid to control communist movements around the world, and in most cases local communist parties split between the two sponsors, confusing fellow travelers and weakening the overall communist movement in the Third World. Beijing said the Soviet Union had fallen into the trap of social imperialism, and was now seen as the greatest threat it faced. Mao made overtures to Richard Nixon and the United States, culminating in the sensational 1972 Nixon visit to China.

Post-Mao era and stabilizing relations

In 1976, Mao died, and in 1978, the Gang of Four were overthrown by Hua Guofeng, who was to soon implement pro-market economic reform. With the PRC no longer espousing the anti-revisionist notion of the antagonistic contradiction between classes, relations between the two countries became gradually normalized. In 1979, however, the PRC invaded Vietnam (which had, after a period of ambivalence, sided with the Soviet Union) in response to the Vietnam's invasion of Cambodia which overthrew the China-backed Khmer Rouge from power.

During the Sino-Soviet split, strained relations between China and the Soviet Union resulted in strained relations between China and the pro-Soviet Afghan communist regime. China and Afghanistan had neutral relations with each other during the rule of King Mohammed Zahir Shah. When the pro-Soviet Afghan communists seized power in Afghanistan in 1978, relations between China and the Afghan communists quickly turned hostile. The Afghan pro-Soviet communists supported the Vietnamese during the Sino-Vietnamese War and blamed China for supporting Afghan anti-communist militants. China responded to the Soviet invasion of Afghanistan by supporting the Afghan mujahideen and ramping up their military presence near Afghanistan in Xinjiang. China acquired military equipment from the United States to defend itself from Soviet attack.

China moved its training camps for the mujahideen from Pakistan into China itself. Hundreds of millions worth of anti-aircraft missiles, rocket launchers and machine guns were given to the mujahideen by the Chinese. Chinese military advisers and army troops were present with the mujahideen during training.

The deaths of Soviet leaders Leonid Brezhnev (in 1982), Yuri Andropov (1984), and Konstantin Chernenko (1985) provided the opportunity for Sino-Soviet "funeral diplomacy" and an improvement in relations. Chinese Foreign Minister Huang Hua met with Soviet Foreign Affairs Minister Andrei Gromyko at Brezhnev's funeral. Chinese Vice Premier and Politburo member Wan Li attended Andropov's funeral in a diplomatic move which signaled China's positive view of Andropov and optimism for better relations. Soviet-educated and Russian-speaking Vice Premier Li Peng attended Chernenko's funeral and met with Soviet leader Mikhail Gorbachev twice. Gorbachev affirmed to Li that the Soviet Union also wished to improve relations. At the Li–Gorbachev meetings, the two sides began again to refer to each other as "comrades" and Li congratulated the Soviet Union for its "socialist course". Despite the reconciliation, China made clear that it would continue to develop an independent foreign policy.

China's reform and opening up and the Soviet Union's perestroika raised similar challenges for both countries. Chinese leader Deng Xiaoping wanted to reduce tensions with the Soviet Union to facilitate focusing resources on economic development. Gorbachev likewise sought a more peaceful bilateral relationship in order to reduce military expenditures. Intrigued by reform and opening up, Gorbachev told a Chinese magazine, "We take special interest in China's ongoing economic and political reforms. Our two countries are now faced with similar problems. This will open a broad horizon for useful mutual exchange of experiences."

The September 1989 withdrawal of Vietnam's forces from Cambodia further reduced Sino-Soviet tension. Gorbachev visited Beijing in May 1989 for the first summit between the two nations in thirty years.

Dissolution of the Soviet Union

Unlike that of the PRC, this was a much more extreme, highly unregulated form of privatization which resulted in massive losses to foreign speculators, near-anarchical conditions and economic collapse. Thus, in the post–Cold War period, while the Soviet Union remained vastly more developed (economically and militarily), in a systemic and deep way (i.e., the PRC in 1949 was less industrialized than Russia in 1914), the PRC emerged in a far more favourable and stable financial position. While the severe Soviet shortage of capital was new, Chinese economic and military underdevelopment was not. Nor was the PRC's desperate and ever-growing need for mineral resources, especially petroleum fuel, which the Soviet Union held in abundance in such Asiatic regions as Western Siberia.

See also
 History of Sino-Russian relations
 History of foreign relations of the People's Republic of China
 Sino-Soviet Treaty of Friendship and Alliance

References

Further reading

External links
 Agreement from 1924 on the establishment of diplomatic relations

 
Soviet Union
Bilateral relations of the Soviet Union